Francis Edwin Kilvert (December 17, 1838 – August 21, 1910) was a lawyer and mayor of Hamilton, Ontario from 1877 to 1878.

Born in Hamilton Township, Northumberland County, Upper Canada, the son of Richard Kilvert, he was educated in Cobourg. In 1863, he married Fanny Young Cory. Kilvert was called to the bar in 1867 and set up practice in Hamilton. After he retired from politics in 1887, Kilvert served as customs collector at Hamilton.

References 

 

1838 births
1910 deaths
Conservative Party of Canada (1867–1942) MPs
Mayors of Hamilton, Ontario
Members of the House of Commons of Canada from Ontario
People from Northumberland County, Ontario